Virapapur  is a village in the southern state of Karnataka, India. It is located in the Sindhnur taluk of Raichur district.

Demographics
 India census, Virapapur had a population of 5518 with 2703 males and 2815 females.

See also
 Raichur
 Districts of Karnataka

References

External links
 http://Raichur.nic.in/

Villages in Raichur district